Oryu-dong station is a metro station on Line 1 of the Seoul Subway. It was opened when the Seoul–Incheon line was first introduced during the Japanese occupation era.

References

Seoul Metropolitan Subway stations
Metro stations in Guro District, Seoul
Railway stations opened in 1899